The British Independent Film Award for Best Supporting Actress is an annual award given by the British Independent Film Awards (BIFA) to recognize the best supporting performance by an actress in a British independent film. 

From 2003 to 2007, only one award was presented for supporting performances named Best Supporting Actor/Actress. Since 2008, two categories named Best Supporting Actor and Best Supporting Actress are presented.

Olivia Colman is the only actress who has won this award more than once since its creations in 2008 with two wins while Kristin Scott Thomas and Julie Walters hold the record of most nominations in this category with three each.

On July 2022, it was announced that the performance categories would be replaced with gender-neutral categories, with both Best Supporting Actor and Best Supporting Actress merging into the Best Lead Performance category. Additionally, a category named Best Joint Lead Performance was created for "two (or exceptionally three) performances that are the joint focus of the film, especially where performances share a large number of scenes and screen time".

Winners and nominees

2000s
 Best Supporting Actor/Actress

 Best Supporting Actress

2010s

2020s

Multiple nominations

3 nominations
 Kristin Scott Thomas
 Julie Walters

2 nominations
 Vanessa Redgrave
 Sally Hawkins
 Sienna Miller
 Anne-Marie Duff
 Helena Bonham Carter
 Rosamund Pike
 Olivia Colman

Multiple wins

2 wins
 Olivia Colman

See also
 Academy Award for Best Supporting Actress
 BAFTA Award for Best Actress in a Supporting Role
 Critics' Choice Movie Award for Best Supporting Actress
 Golden Globe Award for Best Supporting Actress – Motion Picture
 Screen Actors Guild Award for Outstanding Performance by a Female Actor in a Supporting Role

References

External links
 Official website

British Independent Film Awards